Quirin op dem Veld von Willich (died 1537) was a Roman Catholic prelate who served as Auxiliary Bishop of Cologne (1521–1537).

Biography
On 25 Oct 1521, Quirin op dem Veld von Willich was appointed during the papacy of Pope Leo X as Auxiliary Bishop of Cologne and Titular Bishop of Cyrene. He served as Auxiliary Bishop of Cologne until his death on 9 Nov 1537.

See also 
Catholic Church in Germany

References

External links and additional sources
 (for Chronology of Bishops) 
 (for Chronology of Bishops)  
 (for Chronology of Bishops) 
 (for Chronology of Bishops)  

16th-century German Roman Catholic bishops
Bishops appointed by Pope Leo X
1537 deaths